Aspredinichthys is a genus of banjo catfishes found in fresh and brackish waters in tropical South America from the Orinoco delta, through the Guianas, to the Amazon delta. Both species are found in lower portions of rivers and in coastal waters of northern South America from Venezuela to northern Brazil where they are benthic fish.

Description
Aspredinichthys species are large aspredinids that grow up to about 22.0 centimetres (8.7 in) SL; they are distinguished from all other aspredinids by the characters including having 8 pectoral-fin rays and several pairs of accessory mental barbels present. The two species placed in this genus are very similar in appearance and are most readily separated by the pattern and number of accessory mental barbels.

Species 
There are currently two described species in this genus:
 Aspredinichthys filamentosus (Valenciennes, 1840) (Sevenbarbed banjo)
 Aspredinichthys tibicen (Valenciennes, 1840) (Tenbarbed banjo)

References

Aspredinidae
Fish of South America
Fauna of Brazil
Fish of Venezuela
Catfish genera
Taxa named by Pieter Bleeker